Zafra bilineata is a species of sea snail in the family Columbellidae, the dove snails.

References

bilineata
Gastropods described in 2008